Spring Hill is a historic home located near Providence Forge, Virginia. It was built about 1765, and is a -story, five-bay, gable-roofed, timber-frame Federal style dwelling.  It has a center-hall plan.  An addition was built in 1947.  Also on the property is a contributing smokehouse. It is representative of a typical mid- to late-18th-century farmhouse in the Tidewater area of Virginia.

The house was built by Richard Croshaw Graves before the American Revolution.  He commanded the New Kent and Charles County militias during the American Revolution (1776–82). After the war, he returned to his plantation, which he called "Indian Fields," and had a new house constructed for his growing family between 1782 and 1784. He died there in 1798. The property passed to his son, Colonel Richard Graves.  The Graves family retained possession of Indian Fields until 1863 when it was sold.

Local legend has it that Thomas Jefferson spent the eve of his wedding to Martha Wayles Skelton at Indian Fields with his friend Richard C. Graves. The young lawyer was traveling from Williamsburg, where he was attending court sessions, to Martha's family home, "The Forest," located in Charles City County. He began his journey on Christmas Eve, and arrived at "The Forest" shortly after Christmas Day, 1771. He would have spent Christmas en route with the Graves family. Jefferson applied for a marriage license on December 31, 1771, and the couple was married on New Year's Day, 1772.

It was listed on the National Register of Historic Places in 2002.

References

Houses on the National Register of Historic Places in Virginia
Federal architecture in Virginia
Houses completed in 1782
Houses in New Kent County, Virginia
National Register of Historic Places in New Kent County, Virginia
1782 establishments in Virginia